

League Standings
                           GP   W   L    PCT   GB     GF    GA  Home  Road
     
 Monterrey La Raza         24  20   4   .833  ----   167   126  12-0   8-4
 Dallas Sidekicks          24  17   7   .708   3.0   153   107   9-3   8-4
 Utah Freezz               24  15   9   .625   5.0   124   113  10-2   5-7
 Houston Hotshots          24  10  14   .417  10.0   125   137   8-4  2-10
 St. Louis Steamers        24   9  15   .375  11.0   125   137   5-7   4-8
 Arizona Thunder           24   8  16   .333  12.0   105   118   5-7   3-9
 Sacramento Knights        24   5  19   .208  15.0    94   155   4-8  1-11

 Playoffs
 Quarter-Finals:          Utah defeated Arizona 9-3           
                           St. Louis defeated Houston 5-3
 Semi-Finals               Dallas defeated Utah 7-4
                           Monterrey defeated St. Louis 7-3
 CHAMPIONSHIP:            Monterrey defeated Dallas 6-5(SO)

Scoring leaders

GP = Games Played, G = Goals, A = Assists, Pts = Points

League awards
Most Valuable Player: Mariano Bollella, Monterrey
                            
Defender of the Year: Rob Baarts, Utah

Rookie of the Year: Clint Regier, Houston

Goalkeeper of the Year: Sagu, Dallas

Coach of the Year: Jeff Betts, Utah

All-WISL Teams

https://www.indoorsoccerhall.com/awards

World Indoor Soccer League